The 1979–80 Nationale A season was the 59th season of the Nationale A, the top level of ice hockey in France. 10 teams participated in the league, and ASG Tours won their first league title. Français Volants was relegated to the Nationale B.

First round

Final round

Relegation

External links
Season on hockeyarchives.info

Fra
1979–80 in French ice hockey
Ligue Magnus seasons